Chah Mazar-e Olya (also Romanized as Chāh Mazār-e ‘Olyā; also known as Chāh Mazār-e Bālā, Chāh Mīrzā, and Chāh Mīrzā Bālā) is a village in Jolgeh-ye Musaabad Rural District, in the Central District of Torbat-e Jam County, Razavi Khorasan Province, Iran. At the 2006 census, its population was 368, in 82 families.

References 

Populated places in Torbat-e Jam County